Albert Ramos was the defending champion. He won for the second consecutive year, defeating Pere Riba in the final 6–1, 6–2.

Seeds

Draw

Finals

Top half

Bottom half

References
 Main draw
 Qualifying draw

Singles